Krishna Nagar or Krishnanagar may refer to:

Places

India
 Krishna Nagar, Delhi
 Krishna Nagar metro station (Delhi)
 Krishna Nagar (Delhi Assembly constituency)
 Krishna Nagar, Hyderabad
 Krishna Nagar, Lucknow
 Krishna Nagar metro station (Lucknow)
 Krishnanagar, Karnataka
 Krishnanagar, Agartala, Tripura
 Krishnanagar, Hooghly, West Bengal
 Krishnanagar, Nadia, West Bengal
 Krishnanagar Academy
 Krishnanagar City Junction railway station
 Krishnanagar I
 Krishnanagar II
 Krishnanagar (Lok Sabha constituency)

Nepal
 Krishnanagar, Nepal

People
 Krishna Nagar (para-badminton), Indian para-badminton player

See also 

 Krishnanagar (disambiguation)
 Krishan Nagar, Lahore, Punjab, Pakistan